First Denbigh Parish Church Archeological Site is a historic archaeological site located at Newport News, Virginia. The site is located on the bluff overlooking the Warwick River at the mouth of Church Creek.  It took its name from nearby Denbigh Plantation and was constructed in 1636.  A new structure was built at a nearby site by 1686 and replaced the former building. A frame structure for Warwick Parish was built on the site about 1774 and the Baptists began using it by 1834.

It was listed on the National Register of Historic Places in 1982.

References

Churches on the National Register of Historic Places in Virginia
Archaeological sites on the National Register of Historic Places in Virginia
National Register of Historic Places in Newport News, Virginia